The 2020 Emilia Romagna and Rimini Riviera motorcycle Grand Prix (officially known as the Gran Premio TISSOT dell'Emilia Romagna e della Riviera di Rimini) was the eighth round of the 2020 Grand Prix motorcycle racing season, the seventh round of the 2020 MotoGP World Championship and the fourth round of the 2020 MotoE World Cup. It was held at the Misano World Circuit Marco Simoncelli in Misano Adriatico on 20 September 2020.

Background

Impact of the COVID-19 pandemic
The opening rounds of the 2020 championship were heavily affected by the COVID-19 pandemic. Several Grands Prix were cancelled or postponed after the aborted opening round in Qatar, prompting the Fédération Internationale de Motocyclisme to draft a new calendar. However, the San Marino and Rimini Riviera Grand Prix was not impacted by this change and kept its original date.

Organisers of the race signed a contract with Dorna Sports, the sport's commercial rights holder, to host a second round at the circuit on 20 September (a week after the first race) to be known as the "Emilia Romagna and Rimini Riviera Grand Prix". The race was named for Emilia Romagna, the region of Italy that the Misano World Circuit Marco Simoncelli is located in. The race was also the third time in the sport's history that the same venue and circuit layout hosted back-to-back World Championship races.

MotoGP Championship standings before the race 
After the seventh round at the 2020 San Marino and Rimini Riviera Grand Prix, Andrea Dovizioso on 76 points,  lead the championship by 6 points over Fabio Quartararo with Jack Miller a further 12 points behind.

In the Teams' Championship, Petronas Yamaha SRT with 127 points, lead the championship from Monster Energy Yamaha with 116. Ducati Team sat 15 points behind the factory Yamaha in third, and one point ahead of fourth-placed Team Suzuki Ecstar with 100 points, while Pramac Racing sat 5th on 97 points.

MotoGP Entrants 

 Stefan Bradl replaced Marc Márquez from the Czech Republic round onwards while he recovered from injuries sustained in his opening round crash.

Free practice

Combined Free Practice 1-2-3 
The top ten riders (written in bold) qualified in Q2.

Free Practice 4 
The first three positions of the session are as follows.

Qualifying

MotoGP

Race

MotoGP

 Stefan Bradl withdrew from the event due to arm pump.

Moto2
The race, scheduled to be run for 25 laps, was red-flagged after 6 full laps due to wet track conditions. The race was later restarted over 10 laps with the starting grid determined by the classification of the first part.

Moto3

 Tatsuki Suzuki suffered a broken left wrist in a crash during qualifying and withdrew from the event.

MotoE

Race 1

All bikes manufactured by Energica.

Race 2

All bikes manufactured by Energica.

Championship standings after the race
Below are the standings for the top five riders, constructors, and teams after the round.

MotoGP

Riders' Championship standings

Constructors' Championship standings

Teams' Championship standings

Moto2

Riders' Championship standings

Constructors' Championship standings

Teams' Championship standings

Moto3

Riders' Championship standings

Constructors' Championship standings

Teams' Championship standings

MotoE

Notes

References

External links

Emilia Romagna
Emilia Romagna and Rimini Riviera motorcycle Grand Prix
Emilia Romagna and Rimini Riviera motorcycle Grand Prix
Emilia Romagna motorcycle Grand Prix